Dergaon Kamal Dowerah College, established in 1962, is a general degree college situated at Dergaon, in Golaghat district, Assam. This college is affiliated with the Dibrugarh University.

Academics

Regular courses
The college offers Higher Secondary (10+2) in arts, commerce and science stream under Assam Higher Secondary Education Council and graduate degree both major and core under Dibrugarh University. It also offers post graduate degree under Dibrugarh University.

Career oriented courses
Certificate in Spoken English
Certificate in Beautician
Certificate in Videography & Editing
Certificate in Basic Computer & *Internet Browsing
Certificate in Tally
Certificate in Desk Top Publishing

It has also the study centre of IGNOU and KKHSOU.

Departments

Science
Physics
Mathematics
Chemistry
Statistics
Botany
Zoology

Arts and Commerce
 Assamese
 English
History
Education
Economics
Philosophy
Political Science
Geography
Commerce

References

External links
http://www.dkdcollege.ac.in/

Universities and colleges in Assam
Colleges affiliated to Dibrugarh University
Educational institutions established in 1962
1962 establishments in Assam